Prodontria is a genus of beetles in the family Scarabaeidae.

Species
The following species are recognised in the genus Prodontria:
 Prodontria capito (Broun 1909)
 Prodontria grandis Given 1964
 Prodontria jenniferae Emerson 1997
 Prodontria lewisi Broun 1904
 Prodontria longitarsis (Broun 1909)
 Prodontria matagouriae Emerson 1997
 Prodontria minuta Emerson 1997
 Prodontria modesta (Broun 1909)
 Prodontria montis Emerson 1997
 Prodontria patricki Emerson 1997
 Prodontria pinguis Given 1952
 Prodontria praelatella (Broun 1909)
 Prodontria rakiurensis Emerson 1997
 Prodontria regalis Emerson 1997
 Prodontria setosa Given 1952
 Prodontria truncata Given 1960

References 

Scarabaeidae genera
Taxonomy articles created by Polbot